Gothminister is a Norwegian gothic/industrial metal band. Formed in 1999, they have released seven albums and have had success in Germany, playing many German music festivals, including Wave-Gotik-Treffen (WGT), the Dark Storm Festival, and the M'era Luna Festival, and performing for over 10,000 people at the Schattenreich Festival.

Members 
Current members
 Bjørn Alexander Brem - lead vocals, programming, instruments
 Christian Svendsen - drums
 Glenn Nilsen - guitars
 Ketil Eggum - guitars

Former members
 Andy Moxnes — keyboards, guitars
 Tom Kalstad - keyboards
 Sandra Jensen — additional vocals

Guest appearances 
 Nell Sigland — vocals on "Wish" (track 10 on Gothic Electronic Anthems), and "Your Saviour", "The Allmighty" and "Emperor" (tracks 3, 6 and 8 respectively on Happiness In Darkness)
 Cecilia Kristensen — the "Girl" in the "Darkside" video
 Eastern Strix- the "Girl" in the "Freak" video

Live guest appearances 
 Eric Burton — live vocals for "Hatred" at M'era Luna Festival 2004
 Bruno Kramm - keyboards on Wave Gotik Treffen and M`Era Luna Festival 2011

Discography 
Albums

2003: Gothic Electronic Anthems
2005: Empire of Dark Salvation
2008: Happiness in Darkness
2011: Anima Inferna
2013: Utopia - (#85 Norway, #96 Germany)
2017: The Other Side
2022: Pandemonium

Singles and EPs

2002: Angel
2002: Devil
2003: The Holy One
2005: Dark Salvation
2005: Swallowed by the Earth
2008: Dusk till Dawn
2009: Freak
2011: Liar
2013: Utopia
2017: Der Fliegende Mann (GER DAC: #8)
2017: The Sun (GER DAC: #14)
2017: Ich Will Alles (GER DAC: #18)
2017: We Are The Ones Who Rule The World (GER DAC: #10)
2022: Pandemonium (GER: DAC #5)
2022: This is Your Darkness (GER DAC: #1)
2022: Demons (GER DAC: #8)

Videography 

2008: Darkside
2009: Freak
2013: Utopia
2013: Horrorshow
2017: Der Fliegende Mann
2017: The Sun
2017: Ich Will Alles
2017: We Are The Ones Who Rule The World
2022: Pandemonium
2022: This is Your Darkness
2022: Demons
2022: Star

External links 

Profile page at Drakkar Records/e-Wave Records

Norwegian gothic metal musical groups
Norwegian industrial metal musical groups
Musical groups established in 1999
1999 establishments in Norway
Musical quintets
Musical groups from Oslo